The 11th Zee Cine Awards ceremony honouring the winners and nominees of the best of Bollywood cinema films released in 2007. The ceremony was held on 26 April 2008 at ExCeL London, London.

Om Shanti Om led the ceremony with 15 nominations, followed by Guru with 10 nominations, and Chak De! India, Life in a... Metro and Taare Zameen Par with 9 nominations each.

Taare Zameen Par won 6 awards, including Best Director (for Aamir Khan), thus becoming the most-awarded film at the ceremony.

Awards 
The winners and nominees have been listed below. Winners are listed first, highlighted in boldface, and indicated with a double dagger.

Popular Awards

Technical Awards

Critics' Awards

Special Awards

Superlatives

References

Zee Cine Awards
2008 Indian film awards
2008 in London